Hoseynabad (also Romanized as Ḩoseynābād) is a village in Qatruyeh Rural District, Qatruyeh District, Neyriz County, Fars Province, Iran. At the 2006 census, its population was 12, in 4 families.

References 

Populated places in Neyriz County